The Ukrainian Catholic University (Ukrains'kyy Katolyts'kyy Universytet) is a Catholic university in Lviv, Ukraine, affiliated with the Ukrainian Greek Catholic Church. The Ukrainian Catholic University (UCU) was the first Catholic university to open on the territory of the former Soviet Union.

The university has 1900 students studying in six faculties. Professional degrees are offered in journalism and business; doctoral degrees in history and theology.

In 2018 and 2019, UCU's entering students had the highest External independent evaluation scores in the country.

History

Overview
The Ukrainian Catholic University was created as the successor to the Greek Catholic Theological Academy created during 1928-1929 by Metropolitan Andrey Sheptytsky in Lviv, at the time part of Poland. Josyf Slipyj became the academy's first rector. After its closure in 1944, the Ukrainian Catholic University in Rome, founded in 1963, continued the academy's functions under the leadership of Metropolitan Slipyj. In 1994, the original school was recreated under the name of Lviv Theological Academy, and in 1998 it became internationally recognized by the Congregation for Catholic Education. On June 28, 2002, the Ukrainian Catholic University was founded based on the Lviv Theological Academy.

Beginning and turmoil
On October 6, 1929, the Greek Catholic Theological Academy was founded in Lviv. Under the guidance of rector Joseph Slipyj, the Academy became the center for theological and philosophic studies almost overnight.

At the time, predominantly Ukrainian-populated Eastern Galicia was under the control of interwar Poland, and the Ukrainian Greek Catholic Church attained a strong Ukrainian national character. Since the Polish authorities did not allow the creation of a secular Ukrainian university, as that would have impeded their Polonization policies, the Academy became the sole Ukrainian institution of higher education on the territory of the Second Polish Republic. For the next ten years, the Academy continued to grow and expand by opening new departments, enlarging its library, and increasing its publishing capacity.

In September 1939, when Eastern Galicia fell under the Soviet control, the Theological Academy was closed and its students arrested or deported. On September 15, 1941, shortly after the onset of the German invasion of the USSR, the Academy's Church of the Holy Spirit and the library were ruined by German bombings. Limited studies resumed under German occupation during the Second World War. Out of 500 students who studied at the Academy between 1941–1944, only 60 received diplomas.  After the Red Army offensive recovered Lviv for the Soviets in the spring of 1945, the Theological Academy was closed, this time for decades, while many of its graduates and professors ended up in the Gulag system of prison camps. Soon afterwards at the Lviv Synod held in March 1946 under the pressure of the Soviet authorities, the Ukrainian Greek Catholic Church was forcibly "united" with the recently recreated Ukrainian Exarchate of the Russian Orthodox Church. The theological education under the UGCC, which formally "ceased to exist" in the USSR (but in reality was banned), was restricted to the underground, as well as the entire UGCC church as a whole. This period is known as the Church of the Catacombs in UGCC history.

Renewal
A new chapter in the UCU history began after Ukraine attained its independence in the wake of the 1991 Soviet collapse. In September 1994, the Lviv Theological Academy (LTA) was opened. In 1998 the LTA was recognized by the Congregation for Catholic Education.

The first graduation took place in the summer of 1999, with twenty-eight graduates receiving their degrees. This marked a significant milestone for the school as well as for theological education in Ukraine in general. For the first time: laity received a Bachelor of Arts degree from a Ukrainian theological school at a post-secondary level; women in Ukraine received a degree in theology.

Ukrainian Catholic University

The UCU came into existence on the foundation prepared for it by the Lviv Theological Academy.  On his visit to Ukraine on June 26, 2001, Pope John Paul II blessed the future university's cornerstone. The ceremonial inauguration honoring its founding took place on June 29, 2002. It was the first university opened by one of the Eastern Catholic Churches, rather than by a religious order.

The founding is seen by the university community as a culmination of efforts by the Ukrainian Greek Catholic Church (UGCC) and Ukrainian academics to create an educational institution, which would grow on the foundation of "Christian spirituality, culture and worldview".

"I consider this project one of the most successful in the field of Ukrainian education", said Vyacheslav Bryukhovetskyy, President of the National University of Kyiv-Mohyla Academy, after the establishment of the Lviv Theological Academy and its subsequent transformation into the Ukrainian Catholic University. The Rector Rev. Borys Gudziak expressed his hope that UCU would be a center for cultural thought and the formation of the new Ukrainian society based on human dignity.

In cooperation with the Institute of Religion and Society of Ukraine, the Ukrainian Catholic University established and runs the Religious Information Service of Ukraine with a multilingual Web Portal. In 2004, the Institute of Ecumenical Studies was established.

Faculties
 Law 
 Sociology
 Computer Science
 IT and business analytics
 Artes Liberales
 Theology
 Ethics Politics Economics
 Social work
 Psychology

UCU is the first Catholic university on post-Soviet territory and the leading independent university in Ukraine. In 2018, UCU’s entrants had the top average standardized test score among all institutions of higher education in Ukraine. The Sheptytsky Center was named “Face of the City of Lviv” in 2017. In 2017, UCU was included in the book “The 10 Most Successful Ukrainian Brands,” a list of the best companies and organizations in Ukraine that set the pace in their various fields.

Foundations and branches
 UCU Kyiv Centre
 Ukrainian Catholic Education Foundation – USA
 The Institute of Pope Clement in Rome
 The Ukrainian Institute in London
 Ukrainian Catholic Education Foundation – Canada
 Patriarch Josyf Slipyj Institute of Ukrainian Culture, UCU’s branch in Argentina
 Lviv Business School of UCU

UCU Entrepreneurship Center 
In April 2020, the UCU Entrepreneurship Center signed a memorandum of cooperation with the Ukrainian Startup Fund.

References

External links
Ukrainian Catholic University

 
Educational institutions established in 1929
Universities and colleges in Lviv
Catholic universities and colleges in Ukraine
Greek Catholic universities and academies in Ukraine
1929 establishments in the Soviet Union